Gilbert Paquette (born October 19, 1942) is a Canadian university professor, businessman, researcher and politician. Paquette is a researcher at the Centre interuniversitaire de recherche sur le téléapprentissage (CIRTA-LICEF), which he founded in 1992. He was National Assembly of Quebec member for the riding of Rosemont from 1976 to 1985 under the Parti Québécois banner and in the final months of his second term as an Independent MNA.

Profile 
Gilbert Paquette is a professor at UQAM. He holds a master's degree in computer science and mathematics and a doctorate from the University of Maine in artificial intelligence and education. He holds a Canada Research Chair. He was the scientific director of the  LORNET network, arguably the largest Canadian Semantic Web initiative. LORNET ran in the period 2003–2008.

He has been the keynote speaker at several international conferences and he is on the board of five journals. Paquette has also founded two companies, Micro-Intel (1987–1991) and Cogigraph (1999–2004).

Paquette was Minister of Sciences and Technology from 1982 to 1984 in the Parti Québécois government of René Lévesque, but left the party in the last few months of his term. He made a comeback on the political scene in 2005 when he joined the Parti Québécois leadership election to succeed Bernard Landry. On November 10, 2005, he withdrew from the race and asked his supporters to vote for Pauline Marois.

In the 2015 Canadian federal election, he ran for the Bloc Québécois in the riding of LaSalle—Émard—Verdun, finishing third.

See also
 Parti Québécois Crisis, 1984
 2005 Parti Québécois leadership election
 Parti Québécois
 Quebec sovereignty movement
 Politics of Quebec

Electoral record (partial)

References

External links 
 
 Centre interuniversitaire de recherche sur le téléapprentissage website (English)

1942 births
Canada Research Chairs
Living people
Parti Québécois MNAs
Politicians from Montreal
Université de Montréal alumni
Academic staff of the Université du Québec à Montréal
Bloc Québécois candidates for the Canadian House of Commons
Candidates in the 2015 Canadian federal election